Sweet Home Alabama is a 2002 American romantic comedy film directed by Andy Tennant. Written by C. Jay Cox, it stars Reese Witherspoon, Josh Lucas and Patrick Dempsey. The supporting cast includes Fred Ward, Mary Kay Place, Jean Smart, Candice Bergen, Ethan Embry, and Melanie Lynskey. It was released in the United States on September 27, 2002, by Buena Vista Pictures. The film takes its title from the 1974 Lynyrd Skynyrd song of the same name. It received a mixed critical reception but was a success at the box office.

Plot

On a beach in the fictional town of Pigeon Creek, Alabama, 10-year-old Jake Perry and Melanie Smooter inspect the result of lightning striking sand. Jake asserts that they will be married one day.

In the present day, Melanie is a successful New York fashion designer who has adopted the surname "Carmichael" to hide her poor Southern roots. After wealthy Andrew Hennings proposes, Melanie returns to Alabama to announce her engagement to her parents and finalize a divorce from her husband Jake, whom she married as a pregnant teenager and left after she miscarried their baby. Meanwhile, Kate Hennings, Andrew's mother and the Mayor of New York City, doubts Melanie's suitability to wed her son, whom she is grooming to run for President of the United States.

Melanie visits Jake, who has repeatedly refused to sign divorce papers over the years since she left for New York. After he orders her out of his house, Melanie empties Jake's checking account, hoping to spur him into ending the marriage. Angry, Jake leaves to meet some friends at a local bar without signing the papers. Melanie follows and gets drunk, insults her old school friends, and outs her longtime friend, Bobby Ray. Jake scolds her and takes her home, preventing her from driving drunk, and Melanie wakes to find the signed divorce papers on her bed.

Melanie goes to the Carmichael plantation and apologizes to Bobby Ray, whose family lives there. She is cornered there by Kate's assistant, sent to gather information on Melanie's background. Bobby Ray backs up her pretense that she is a relative and the family mansion is her childhood home. Melanie reconciles with her friends and learns that after she split with Jake, he had followed her to New York to win her back. Intimidated by the city and her success, he returned home to make something of himself first. She and Jake have a heart-to-heart, and Melanie realises why he never signed their divorce papers.

Andrew arrives to surprise Melanie, but upon learning her true background and that she never told him she was married, he angrily leaves. He later returns, saying he still wants to marry her, and the wedding is immediately set in motion. Melanie's New York friends arrive for the event. While visiting a nearby restaurant/resort with a glassblowing gallery, they admire the glass sculptures that are similar to ones they have seen in New York. Melanie realizes Jake is the artist and that he owns the resort.

During Melanie and Andrew's wedding at the Carmichael estate, a lawyer arrives and halts the ceremony. He has the divorce papers, which Melanie hadn't signed. Melanie confesses that she still loves Jake and cancels the wedding. She and Andrew wish each other well, though Kate berates Andrew and insults Melanie, her family, and the entire town, for which Melanie punches her in the face. Melanie finds Jake at the beach planting lightning rods in the sand during a rainstorm to create more glass sculptures. She tells him they are still married, they return to what would have been Melanie and Andrew's reception, and finally, have their first dance as husband and wife.

A mid-credits sequence shows that they have a baby daughter, Melanie continues to thrive as a designer, and Jake opens a "Deep South Glass" franchise in New York. Andrew is engaged to a girl named Erin Vanderbilt.

Cast

In addition, Dakota Fanning and Thomas Curtis appear briefly as the childhood versions of Melanie and Jake, respectively.

Production

Casting
Charlize Theron was considered for the lead role before Reese Witherspoon was cast.

Katharine Towne was cast as Witherspoon's character's assistant who ultimately ends up marrying the Patrick Dempsey character, but all other scenes were dropped in the final cut.

Filming
Although centered in a fictional version of the town of Pigeon Creek, near a fictional version of Greenville, Alabama, the film was mostly shot in Georgia. The Carmichael Plantation, which Melanie tells the reporter is her childhood home, is the Oak Hill Berry Museum, a historic landmark in Georgia which is near the campus of Berry College in Rome, Georgia.

Sweet Home Alabama was the first film allowed to shoot in New York City after the September 11, 2001 attacks. It was also the first film allowed to film at Tiffany's since Breakfast at Tiffany's (1961).

The streets and storefronts of Crawfordville, Georgia, were used as the backdrop for the Catfish Festival and other downtown scenes. The coonhound cemetery was on Moore Street in Crawfordville and the bar was located at Heavy's Barbecue near the town. Glass that forms when lightning hits sand, as in the film, is called fulgurite.

Jake's glassblowing shop was filmed at an old mill named Starr's Mill, in Fayette County, Georgia. Wynn's Pond in Sharpsburg, Georgia, is the location where Jake lands his plane. The historic homes shown at Melanie's return to Pigeon Creek were shot in Eufaula, Alabama.

Release

Critical response
This film received mostly mixed reviews from critics. On Rotten Tomatoes, the film holds a critical score of 38% based on 159 reviews, with an average rating of 5.19/10. The site's critics consensus reads: "Reese Witherspoon is charming enough, but the road to Alabama is well-traveled." At Metacritic, the film has a weighted average score of 45 out of 100 based on 35 critics, indicating "mixed or average reviews". Audiences polled by CinemaScore gave the film an average grade of "A–" on an A+ to F scale.

Roger Ebert, critic for the Chicago Sun Times, awarded it three-out-of-four stars, commenting, "It is a fantasy, a sweet, light-hearted fairy tale with Reese Witherspoon at its center. She is as lovable as Doris Day would have been in this role... So I enjoyed Witherspoon and the local color, but I am so very tired of the underlying premise." Andrew Sarris, critic for the New York Observer, said that the movie "Would be an unendurable viewing experience for this ultra-provincial New Yorker if 26-year-old Reese Witherspoon were not on hand to inject her pure fantasy character, Melanie Carmichael, with a massive infusion of old-fashioned Hollywood magic."

Box office performance
The film grossed over US$35 million in its first weekend. At the time, it had the highest September opening weekend, surpassing Rush Hour. For a decade, the film would hold this record until 2012 when Hotel Transylvania took it. By the end of its run in the United States, Sweet Home Alabama grossed over US$130 million, and another US$53,399,006 internationally. With a reported budget of US$30 million, it was a box office hit, despite the mixed reviews.

Awards and accolades

Soundtrack
Sweet Home Alabama (Original Motion Picture Soundtrack), the film soundtrack, includes thirteen songs by different artists.

See also

 The Judge—a 2014 film with a similar plot of a protagonist with a successful big city career drawn back to an old hometown. 
 Middle America

References

External links

 

2002 films
2002 comedy films
2002 LGBT-related films
2002 romantic comedy-drama films
American fantasy comedy films
American LGBT-related films
American romantic comedy-drama films
Films about weddings
Films about fashion designers
Films directed by Andy Tennant
Films produced by Neal H. Moritz
Films scored by George Fenton
Films set in Alabama
Films set in New York City
Films shot in Alabama
Films shot in Georgia (U.S. state)
Films shot in New York City
Original Film films
Touchstone Pictures films
2000s English-language films
2000s American films